Orkkuka Vallappozhum (Remember Once A while) is a Malayalam movie released in 2009. This 120-minute feature has Thilakan as Sethumadhavan - a seventy-year-old enjoying his retired life and trying to rediscover the innocence of his past. It marks the return of actor Krishnachandran after an absence of 23 years.

Plot 
Sethumadhavan is left alone following the death of his wife and the migration of his only son and his family to a foreign nation. With nothing much to do the old man takes a fifteen-hour drive to an old bungalow in the high ranges where he had spent his childhood and adolescent times, studying in the British school nearby. While walking through the nostalgic steps, ignoring the hardships of his age, Sethumadhavan also memorizes Paru, his schoolmate with whom he had spent some important stages of his life.

Sethumadhavan collects details about Paru from the localities but is finally disheartened to hear about the sad fate that embraced her. Totally shattered, the old man then decides to take a different route, which may instill the lost happiness to his life. The loneliness that he experiences in his life, on account of the death of his wife and also on account of his son being far away, in a foreign land, makes him seek refuge in the memories of the past.

Cast 
 Thilakan	as Sethumadhavan
 Jagadish
 Krishnachandran
 Malavika Nair
 Rejith Menon as Teen Sethumadhavan
 Chali Pala 		
Shilpa Bala as Paru / Devayani
 Bindu Varappuzha		
 Master Dhananjay as Child Sethumadhavan
 Meera Vasudevan

Songs

 "Orkkuka Vallappozhum"
 "Mambooppadam"
 "Etho January Massam"
 "Aa Raavil"
 "Enthinaamizhi"
 "Thamarapookkalum"
 "Etho January F"

External links

https://www.nowrunning.com/movie/5994/malayalam/orkuka-vallappozhum/1974/review.htm

https://www.filmibeat.com/malayalam/reviews/2009/orkkuka-vallapozhum-review-270109.html

2009 films
2000s Malayalam-language films
Films scored by M. Jayachandran